Kaźmierz  is a village in Szamotuły County, Greater Poland Voivodeship, in west-central Poland. It is the seat of the gmina (administrative district) called Gmina Kaźmierz.

The village has a population of 1,536.

References

Villages in Szamotuły County